"Vida Loca" (stylized in all caps) is a song recorded by American hip hop group Black Eyed Peas, American singer Nicky Jam and American rapper Tyga for the groups eighth studio album, Translation (2020). It was written by William Adams, Allan Pineda, Jimmy Luis Gomez, Tyga, Nicky Jam, James Johnson, Alonzo Miller and Kirk Burrell, and produced by Adams under his stage name will.i.am. "Vida Loca" was released as the fourth single from the album on September 1, 2020.

Music video
The music video for "Vida Loca" was released on August 21, 2020.

Live performances
The song was performed at the 2020 MTV Video Music Awards on August 30, 2020.

Track listing
Digital download and streaming – TRIO mix
"Vida Loca" (TRIO mix) – 2:41

Charts

Release history

References

2020 songs
2020 singles
Black Eyed Peas songs
Nicky Jam songs
Tyga songs
Song recordings produced by will.i.am
Songs written by apl.de.ap
Songs written by MC Hammer
Songs written by Nicky Jam
Songs written by Rick James
Songs written by Taboo (rapper)
Songs written by Tyga
Songs written by will.i.am